Emil G. J. Bernstorff (born 7 June 1993) is a British racing driver of Danish and German descent. He last raced in the 2016 GP2 Series.

Career

Karting
Born in Greater London, Bernstorff began karting in 2003 and raced mostly in the United Kingdom for the majority of his karting career, working his way up from the junior ranks to progress through to the KF2 category by 2009, when he finished in eighth position in the Spanish KF2 championship.

British Formula Ford
2010 saw Bernstorff début in the British Formula Ford Championship with Jamun Racing. He finished seventh in the championship with three podiums.

ADAC Formel Masters
In 2011, Bernstorff took part in the full ADAC Formel Masters season with Motopark Academy, taking thirteen podiums in twenty-four races, including five victories, to finish runner-up in the final championship standings.

FIA European Formula 3 Championship
Bernstorff stepped up to the FIA European Formula Three Championship in 2012, switching to ma-con Motorsport. He finished tenth, with a podium finish at the Norisring.

German Formula Three Championship
Bernstorff moved to the German Formula Three Championship in 2013, reviving his collaboration with Motopark Academy, now running under the Lotus moniker.

Twitch Streaming
Bernstorff began streaming iRacing on Twitch.tv in July 2020 amid the Coronavirus pandemic.

Racing record

Career summary

Complete GP3 Series results
(key) (Races in bold indicate pole position) (Races in italics indicate fastest lap)

Complete GP2 Series results
(key) (Races in bold indicate pole position) (Races in italics indicate fastest lap)

References

External links
 
 

1993 births
Living people
Sportspeople from London
British people of Danish descent
British people of German descent
Danish racing drivers
English racing drivers
Formula Ford drivers
ADAC Formel Masters drivers
Formula 3 Euro Series drivers
FIA Formula 3 European Championship drivers
German Formula Three Championship drivers
Euroformula Open Championship drivers
GP3 Series drivers
GP2 Series drivers
Carlin racing drivers
Arden International drivers
Ma-con Motorsport drivers
Motopark Academy drivers
Prema Powerteam drivers
Team West-Tec drivers